The Miss New York Teen USA competition is the pageant that selects the representative for the state of New York in the Miss Teen USA pageant. It is directed by D&D Productions. In 1983, New York became the 1st state ever that won the Miss Teen USA title for the first time.

New York is also one of only five states to have won the Miss Congeniality award at least two times.

Mahdiya Chowdhury of New York City was crowned Miss New York Teen USA 2022 on June 4, 2022, at the Seneca Niagara Casino & Hotel in Niagara Falls, New York. She will represent New York for the title of Miss Teen USA 2022 in October 2022.

Results summary

Placements
Miss Teen USAs: Ruth Zakarian (1983)
1st runners-up: Jessica Collins (1988), Gloria Almonte (2001)
2nd runners-up: Claudia Liem (1986)
Top 6: Sarah Gore (1993)
Top 10: Michelle Kelenski (1987), Beth Savage (1989), Aiesha Hendrick (1996), Marley Delduchetto (2002), Catherine Muldoon (2004)
Top 15: Natascha Bessez (2005), Thatiana Diaz (2010), Geena Cardalena (2015), Isabella Griffith (2017)
Top 16: Sabrina Mastrangelo (2012), Nikki Orlando (2013)
New York holds a record of 16 placements at Miss Teen USA.

Awards
Miss Congeniality: Amber Evans (1992), Morgan Maholick (1999)
Miss Photogenic: Sana Idnani (2008)
Miss Congeniality: Melissa Minisci (1999)

Winners 

1 Age at the time of the Miss Teen USA pageant

References

External links
 

New York
Women in New York (state)
New York (state) culture